Ophrys argolica, the late spider orchid, or Argolian bee-orchid, is a terrestrial species of orchid native to Greece, Italy, Croatia, Cyprus, Turkey, Lebanon and Syria. The epithet "argolica" refers to the Argolia region of Greece, southwest of Athens.

Subspecies
At present (May 2014), 7 subspecies are recognized:

Ophrys argolica subsp. aegaea (Kalteisen & H.R.Reinhard) H.A.Pedersen & Faurh. - Greek islands
Ophrys argolica subsp. argolica - Greece
Ophrys argolica subsp. biscutella (O.Danesch & E.Danesch) Kreutz - southern Italy, Croatia
Ophrys argolica subsp. crabronifera (Sebast. & Mauri) Faurh. - central and southern Italy
Ophrys argolica subsp. elegans (Renz) E.Nelson - Cyprus
Ophrys argolica subsp. lesbis (Gölz & H.R.Reinhard) H.A.Pedersen & Faurh. - western Turkey and the Greek Islands
Ophrys argolica subsp. lucis (Kalteisen & H.R.Reinhard) H.A.Pedersen & Faurh. - Turkey, Syria, Greek islands

References

External links
IUCN Red List of Threatened Species
Arkive, Wildscreen, Argolic ophrys (Ophrys argolica)
IOSPE photos, Orchid species, Ophrys argolica 
Orchids of Europe, photographic archives
SFO-PCV Société Française d'Orchidophilie de Poitou-Charentes et Vendée, Les Orchidées de Grèce - Le Péloponnèse - Page 9 : Ophrys argolica.

argolica
Orchids of Europe
Flora of Greece
Flora of Croatia
Flora of Cyprus
Flora of Italy
Flora of Turkey
Flora of Lebanon and Syria
Plants described in 1919